InnoVida was a manufacturer of building materials, founded by businessman Claudio Osorio. It entered bankruptcy in 2011, one in a string of companies taken into bankruptcy under Osorio's leadership.

History 
 25 April 2007, the Osorios were insolvent by this point as court papers would later reveal.
 16 November 2007, Jeb Bush becomes a consultant for $15000 a month. Before signing up, Bush conducted a background check on Osorio which found "no red flags indicating criminal or financial wrongdoing."

About Company 
Inepar Inepar SA Industria e Construcoes (INEP4:BZ)
Industry: Machinery-Therml Process •  BM&FBOVESPA  • Currency: BRL

They took parts of a material and processing technology originally invented by a German company, and claimed from then on to have developed this technology calling it ¨InnoVidaPanels (Composite Structural Insulated Panels or CSIPs).  Using project materials, names and products like being their own property in the beginning they presented it as an alternative to traditional construction materials, with the goal of allowing for faster and cost-effective construction. ¨InnoVida's¨ sandwich panels are similar to the materials used to make watercraft and aircraft, such as  the Boeing 787 and Airbus A350. Uli Schwartau and Claudio Osorio were the founder and co-founder and CEOs of InnoVida. Uli Schwartau was inventor of the technology, Claudio Osorio was previously the CEO of CHS Electronics, Inc.

InnoVida had operations in USA, Germany, the Middle East, Africa, Central and South America.

Past projects include: The 20,000 sft. Tameer Holdings Corporate office building, A 45-foot pyramid, made of InnoVida panels built in UK's Hyde Park and painted by the artist Romero Britto, a $15M USD Factory in Tanzania, a $28M USD project in Chengdu, China for post-disaster reconstruction and new village building.

Products
InnoVida's composite building materials (CSIPS), are similar to the materials used to make watercraft and aircraft, such as the Boeing 787 and Airbus A350.

CSIPs reduce building costs by almost half because cement, steel and wood would not be required.

References

External links 
Official Website

Building materials companies of the United States
Accounting scandals
Corporate crime
Defunct manufacturing companies based in Florida
Manufactured home manufacturers
American companies established in 2005
American companies disestablished in 2011
2005 establishments in Florida
2011 disestablishments in Florida
Companies that filed for Chapter 11 bankruptcy in 2011